Günther Karl Erich Brennecke (13 January 1927 – 25 February 2014) was a German field hockey player who competed in the 1952 Summer Olympics and 1956 Summer Olympics.

Brennecke was born in Goslar in 1927 and died there in 2014.

References

External links
 

1927 births
2014 deaths
People from Goslar
German male field hockey players
Olympic field hockey players of Germany
Olympic field hockey players of the United Team of Germany
Field hockey players at the 1952 Summer Olympics
Field hockey players at the 1956 Summer Olympics
Olympic bronze medalists for the United Team of Germany
Olympic medalists in field hockey
Medalists at the 1956 Summer Olympics
20th-century German people